Live is the first official compilation of live material by the band Ben Folds Five. It was released on June 4, 2013 via Ben Folds' own ImaVeePee Records and distributed by Sony Music Entertainment.

The album is a compilation of live recordings taken during the band's world tour in support of their reunion record, The Sound of the Life of the Mind.

Reception

The album received positive reviews from AllMusic, Paste Magazine, and American Songwriter. Allmusic gave Ben Folds Five: Live 3 out of 5 stars, saying "...while the trio may not enjoy the same levels of athleticism that they did in their twenties, they've certainly lost nothing in the chops department."

Track listing

Personnel
Ben Folds – piano, vocals
Darren Jessee – drums, vocals
Robert Sledge – bass, vocals

Production
Recording: Leo Overtoom
Mixing: Joe Costa
Mastering: Steve Marcussen
Monitor Engineer: Michael Praytor
Photography: Clay Lancaster and Ben Folds

References

Ben Folds Five albums
2013 live albums